Horatio Samuel Hildyard (17 October 1805 – 10 April 1886) was an English first-class cricketer and clergyman.

The son of The Reverend William Hildyard, he was born in October 1805 at Winestead, Yorkshire. He was educated at Shrewsbury School, before going up to Peterhouse, Cambridge in 1826. He was elected a fellow in 1831, and while he was a visiting fellow at the University of Oxford, Hildyard played two first-class cricket matches for Oxford University in 1832, both against the Marylebone Cricket Club. 

Hildyard took holy orders in the Church of England and was ordained in June 1832 as a priest at Rochester, a post he held for just under a year until he was transferred to Carlisle in 1833. He became the curate of Little Wilbraham in Cambridgeshire from 1834–42, during which time he was also a classics lecturer at the University of Cambridge. He became a rector at Loftus in North Yorkshire from 1842 until his death there in April 1886. His brother was the scholar James Hildyard.

References

External links

1805 births
1886 deaths
People from Holderness
People educated at Shrewsbury School
Alumni of Peterhouse, Cambridge
Fellows of Peterhouse, Cambridge
English cricketers
Oxford University cricketers
19th-century English Anglican priests
Lecturers